Justice Parsons may refer to:

Frank Nesmith Parsons (1854–1934), chief justice of the New Hampshire Supreme Court
James M. Parsons (1858–1937), associate justice of the Iowa Supreme Court
Silas Parsons (c. 1800–1860), associate justice of the Alabama Supreme Court
Theophilus Parsons (1750–1813), chief justice of the Massachusetts Supreme Judicial Court